Brant—Haldimand was a federal electoral district in Ontario, Canada, that was represented in the House of Commons of Canada from 1953 to 1968, and in the Legislative Assembly of Ontario from 1987 to 1999.

The riding was created in 1952 from parts of Brant—Wentworth and Haldimand.

It consisted of the counties of Haldimand and Brant. The townships of Burford and Oakland in Brant were excluded, along with the part of the township of Brantford lying south and west of Grand River, the part of the township of Brantford not included in the electoral district of Brantford, and the city of Brantford.

The electoral district was abolished in 1966 when it was redistributed between Brant, Norfolk—Haldimand and Welland ridings.

Members of Parliament 

This riding elected the following Members of Parliament:

Federal election results

|}

|}

|}

|}

|}

See also 

 List of Canadian federal electoral districts
 Past Canadian electoral districts

External links 
Riding history from the Library of Parliament

Former federal electoral districts of Ontario